Alba-la-Romaine is a commune in the Ardèche department in the Auvergne-Rhône-Alpes region of southern France.

The inhabitants of the commune are known as Albains or Albaines

Geography
Alba-la-Romaine is located some 5 km west of Montelimar on a mountain ridge overlooking the Rhone river valley. The commune can be accessed on Highway N102 running west from Le Teil and through the northern part of the commune and continuing west to Saint-Jean-le-Centenier.  Local Road D253 enters the commune from Sceautres in the north and runs south crossing the N102 before continuing to the village of Alba-la-Romaine and then continuing south to Valvigneres. Another district road the D107 commences from the village and goes south to Saint-Thome. There is an extensive network of small country roads throughout the commune.

There are extensive areas of farmland in the commune especially following the ridge line from north to south as well as steep mountain slopes. An extensive network of streams throughout the commune run into L'Escoutay river which runs south out of the commune then east to join the Rhone near Viviers. The western border of the commune is formed by the Ruisseau de Julieu. Le Rounei, and Le Ruisseau de Berg streams which flow into Le Salauzon stream which is part of the southern border of the commune before eventually joining L'Escoutay river.

There are a few villages and hamlets in the commune including: Les Baumes, Le Buis d'Aps, La Roche, Saint-Philippe, and Le Pont.
A metre-gauge railway line traverses the north of the commune but the nearest station is at Saint-Jean-le-Centenier.

There are also the remains of a Roman city and a medieval village in the commune.

Neighbouring communes and towns

Toponymy
Alba-la-Romaine town was founded in Roman times and bore the name Alba Helviorum ("Alba of the Helvii," an ancient Celtic people).  It was the capital of the Helvii and became the episcopal see during the 4th century.  From the Middle Ages until 1904, it bore the name Aps, the family name of the local proprietors.

The origin of the name Alba is not Latin as may be thought (in Latin albus meaning 'white') but pre-Celtic<ref>alba = "high mountain" , source: Archeological Map of Gaul - Ardèche O7, Académie des inscriptions et belles-lettres, 2001, p. 97. This name from the Celtic era was a placename either for on top of a mountain or walking on the mountain, which is the case for "Alba of the Helviens", source: Vivarais Ardèche, Encyclopédies régionales, Editions Bonneton (Paris),  1991,  p. 17.</ref> or Celtic.

The current name of the village was formalized on 30 May 1986.  Previously the village had been called only Alba.

History
It has been assumed that when the city of Alba was founded at the beginning of the Roman Empire it was the successor, as often occurred in Gaul, of an earlier city. The existence of a protohistoric oppidum Chaulène on the plateau, northwest of Alba, is in fact likely. The assumption of a lowland habitat can also be used as the excavations to the west of the "St. Peter" site have yielded the remains of stone tools dating from the late third millennium. At the location of two "domus" south-east of the "home field Lauzun" site, a habitat was found of La Tène III (first century BC.) The discovery of imported ceramics of "Campanian type A" which debris was also collected in "Saint-Pierre" such as collars, handles, and lips of wine amphorae from Italy and some Allobrogian currency issued in the third quarter of the 1st century AD revealed a long term relationship with the Romans before the invasion. Other hill forts are known in the territory of Helviens such as Jastres North.

When Bituitos, the Chief of the Arverni people who were located beyond the Cevennes, was defeated in 121 BC by the Roman consul Quintus Fabius Maximus Allobrogicus, Alba was already the capital of the Helviens territory which corresponded approximately to the current department of the Ardeche. Their neighbours were Segusiavi: to the north-west the Vellaves Gabales and to the south Volques Arécomiques. Fabius Maximus managed to separate the Helviens the Allobroges and Arverni and draw them into alliance with Rome. They obtained the title of allies and friends of Rome and Julius Caesar observed, on his arrival in Gaul, that they were independent and had their own customs and administration. In 83 BC Cabur, the Chief of the helviens obtained Roman citizenship under the name of Gaius Valerius Caburus and his son Gaius Valerius Troucillus became a friend of Julius Caesar. The pro-Roman politics of the Helviens allowed Caesar to install his forces near the Arverni. After winning over the Helvie and its capital Alba there was major economic development.

Subsequently, Augustus Caesar conferred on Alba the privilege of Roman law. First attached to the province of Aquitaine in the time of Strabo, it appears to have been integrated into the province of Narbonne.

"The Starting point of the Roman roads to Valence, Vienne, and Lyon by the banks of the Rhone, another to Bourg-Saint-Andéol, Narbonne, and finally to Gergovie. Apart from the roads, Alba was the centre of an agricultural region,  especially for wine, and a regional trading centre of Gaul.... Alba was from the first century a major city", said Marcel Le Glay, "although not equaling the splendour of Arles, Orange, Nimes or Vienne. Until its peak in the second century, Alba developed on two axes: south on the terraces of Escoutay and north in the "Bagnols" district located near the valley the Rhone below the Massif Central.

At the time of the Christianization of the city, the first episcopal see of the region remains uncertain, ranging from the late first century or that of the second century. After its decline, probably from the late third century, the city lost its episcopal function in the middle of the fourth century to the benefit of Viviers. The ancient site was abandoned and a new settlement was made in the Middle Ages in the location of the present village.

The names of the Bishops of Alba are known to us through a document written in 950 by the Bishop of Viviers (Thomas II): the Charta Vetus: they were called Januarius, Septimius, Maspicianus, Melanus and Auxonius. The existence of a Bishop Avolus is a popular tradition (Yves Esquieu). This was attributed to the Alemanni at the destruction of Alba Helvorium in 406 AD.
 
Bishop Avolus was put to death and his successor Bishop Auxionus established the fortified town of Viviers which gave him his diocese name Vivarais. Yves Esquieu  gave a transfer date around 475 but if so then the transfer would have been done by Promotus, a successor of Bishop Auxonius.

Against the wall of the Jewish cemetery in the northern district of Bonn, Germany there is a relief from the tombstone of the first known inhabitant of Bonn: namely a Roman soldier who came in 35 AD from Helviorium Alba (Alba-La-Romaine today). The tombstone inscription, translated from Latin means:

"Here lies Publius Clodius, son of Plubius, from the Voltinia Region, born at Alba, soldier of the first legion, 48 years old, died after 25 years of service.".

Heraldry

Administration

List of Successive Mayors of Alba-la-Romaine

Population

Distribution of Age Groups
The age distribution of the population of the town is close to the departmental average.

Percentage Distribution of Age Groups in Alba-la-Romaine and Ardèche Department in 2017

Source: INSEEÉvolution et structure de la population en 2017: Département de l'Ardèche (07)

Festivities and events
In 1979 the town was the location of the filming of the TV series Kick, Raoul, la moto, les jeunes et les autres.
On Friday 28 November 2008  : A carriage from an SNCF train overturned killing one and injuring five, one seriously.

Economy

Agricultural production: wine
"At Alba Helvienne in the province of Narbonne, a vine has been created that loses its bloom in a day and is therefore very robust. It is called Carbunica and now the whole province has the plant". Pliny the Elder wrote this in 65 AD, probably refderring to table grapes, but this text attests to the presence of the vine in Helvie at that time.

The Soil: Vines are cultivated on the south side of Coiron, on the hillside of Mount Juliau, and on the banks of the Escoutay river. On the territory of the Wine Cooperative of Alba, a mapping has identified different soils such as "La Gravette" boulders of limestone and basalt, and black soil of volcanic origin. With a Mediterranean climate, the vineyard benefits from strong sunlight guaranteed by the freshness of the mistral.

The Vines: White wines from Alba are: Chardonnay, Viognier, Sauvignon, and Grenache. Red wines are: Pinot, Syrah, black Grenache, Merlot, and Cabernet Sauvignon. The harvesting of the different grape varieties ranges from 4 to 5 weeks: from late August to early October. The winemakers have a process of rational production which respects the environment.

Every Wednesday in July and August at 4:30pm a guided tour called "under the vines, an ancient city" combines modern and ancient viticulture under the direction of Sebastian Jaillet (Wine expert) and guides appointed by the General Council which owns the site.

Culture and heritage
The commune contains a large number of sites and buildings - especially farmhouses - that have been registered as historical monuments. There are also a large number of items registered as historical objects contained in many buildings throughout the commune.

Monuments and tourist sites

The village has been ranked among Les Plus Beaux Villages de France (the Most Beautiful Villages of France), but is not certified to date.

Archaeological site

The ancient city, capital of the Helviens people covers 30 hectares. It includes a monumental centre, such monuments were mandatory ornaments of any Gallo-Roman capital in the political and administrative system of the Roman Empire. This monumental centre consists of a forum (still buried under vines), a basilica, two temples, a curia, a small local senate, and two enigmatic buildings as their architecture leaves no tangible indication as to their function. A hypothesis is that they could be used by corporations which were known to be rich and powerful in Alba. A covered market or "macellum" completes the ornaments of this monumental centre.

A little further on in the vineyards, the sanctuary of Bagnols is home to three temples: a fanum (a Gallo-Roman temple), a temple on a podium, and a temple dedicated to the worship of the Roman emperor. A statue of an emperor has been found.

Finally, the theatre. It is the best preserved public building on the site. An outstanding place of entertainment and sociability, it also allowed the cohesion of the city within the framework of the empire. The steps or "cavea" allowed a selection of the people who came in their entirety to attend performances. The stage wall overlooks a stage, which no longer exists, and was built on a channeled stream, the stream of the massacre. Behind the stage wall there is a rectangular courtyard which was used in religious ceremonies.

Château d'Alba

Dating from the 12th to the 16th centuries, the Château of Alba had a military function as well as being a prestigious residence. It is listed in the inventory of Historic Monuments  and is open to the public (exhibitions, events).

Notable people

On 15 September 1948, the painter André Lhote published in the newspaper Combat an article that described "the stony streets of Alba, its walls irregular checkerboards with alternate haphazardly arranged black and white stones, which makes this a wonderful material, a little austere, that is found throughout the Ardèche roads. The Abandoned houses still have their roofs which is miraculous (...). Here is a village eagerly waiting for its resurrection. What is the artist, the intellectual has his nest egg, one or two dozen surplus notes that could be put into the work to be done: save a beautiful old house which miraculously survived the war and universal contempt, moreover to ensure a noble vacation in a country where the most capricious combinations of natural elements abound?".

From 1949 many foreign artists and personalities settled and rebuilt houses in Alba-la-Romaine, including:

Jean Bertholle
Jean Le Moal
Etienne Hajdu
Carmen Herrera and Jesse Loewenthal
Stanley Hayter
Helen Phillips
Alejandro Obregon
Theodore Appleby

See also
Communes of the Ardèche department
Romanization (cultural)
Roman Empire
Caburus
Julius Caesar

References

Sources
Grégoire Ayala, Alba-la-Romaine (Ardèche): the terracotta lamps, Narbonne Archaeological Review, 23, 1990, p. 153-212 Read online. 
Abbot Pierre Arnaud, Arms of the Castle of Alba, Printing Lucien Volle, Privas, 1974 
Abbot Constant, The Ruins of Albe: Clarifications of the origins of the Church of Viviers, Ed. Imprimerie et Librairie du patronage Saint Pierre, Nice, 1882 
Joelle Dupraz, Christel Fraisse, Commune 005 - Alba-la-Romaine, Archaeological Map of Gaul, 2001, p. 97-194,  
Yves Esquieu, The Oldest Churches in Alba'', IB. 3 rue Recamier - Vth Lyon, 1970.

Notes

External links

Alba-la-Romaine official website 
Alba-la-Romaine on Géoportail, National Geographic Institute (IGN) website 
Aps on the 1750 Cassini Map

Communes of Ardèche